The FIVB Beach Volleyball World Championships is the double-gender world championship for the sport of beach volleyball organized by the  (FIVB) the sport's global governing body. The first official edition of the event was held in Los Angeles, United States in 1997 and tournaments had been awarded every two years since then. Before 1997, ten unofficial championships not organized by the FIVB were all held in Rio de Janeiro, Brazil between 1987 and 1996. The most recent World Championships took place in Rome, Italy in 2022

Winning the World Championships is considered to be one of the highest honours in international beach volleyball, surpassing the FIVB Beach Volleyball World Tour and being surpassed only by the Beach Volleyball tournament at the Summer Olympic Games.

Format
The tournament has a 48-team main draw per gender and consists of two stages: the group stage followed by the knockout stage. The prize pool for each gender is US$500,000.

Editions
First Beach Volleyball World Championships were held from 10 to 13 September 1997 in Los Angeles, California (United States). It was the first official edition of this event, after 10 unofficial championships between 1987 and 1996.

Results Summary

Men's tournament

Women's tournament

Medals
As of 2022 Beach Volleyball World Championships.

Men

Women

Total

See also
 Beach volleyball at the Summer Olympics
 FIVB Beach Volleyball World Tour
 European Beach Volleyball Tour
 FIVB Beach Volleyball U23 World Championships
 FIVB Beach Volleyball U21 World Championships
 FIVB Beach Volleyball U19 World Championships
 FIVB Beach Volleyball U17 World Championships

References

External links
Fédération Internationale de Volleyball – official website
2017 FIVB Beach Volleyball World Championships – official website

 
Recurring sporting events established in 1997
 
Biennial sporting events